Sergej Kozlík (born 27 July 1950 in Bratislava)
is a Slovak politician, who had served as the Minister of Finance of Slovakia, Member of the European Parliament and MP of the Slovak parliament.

He sat on its Committee on Budgets, and is a substitute for the Committee on Economic and Monetary Affairs and a member of the Delegation to the ACP-EU Joint Parliamentary Assembly.

See also
2004 European Parliament election in Slovakia

References

External links
 
 

1950 births
Living people
Finance ministers of Slovakia
Politicians from Bratislava
People's Party – Movement for a Democratic Slovakia MEPs
MEPs for Slovakia 2004–2009
MEPs for Slovakia 2009–2014
Members of the National Council (Slovakia) 1998-2002
Members of the National Council (Slovakia) 2002-2006
University of Economics in Bratislava alumni